Hyllinge is the second largest locality situated in Åstorp Municipality, Skåne County, Sweden with 2,204 inhabitants in 2010.

The settlement grew up in the 19th century around a coal mine. The first Swedish cases of the Spanish flu were detected here in 1918.

References 

Populated places in Åstorp Municipality
Populated places in Skåne County